The 1991 Tour de France was the 78th edition of the Tour de France, taking place from 6 to 28 July. The race was won by Miguel Induráin, whose Banesto team also won the team classification. The points classification was won by Djamolidine Abdoujaparov, although he almost crashed out in the final stage. The mountains classification was won by Claudio Chiappucci, and the young rider classification by Álvaro Mejía.

Teams

The 1991 Tour had a starting field of 22 teams of 9 cyclists. Sixteen teams qualified by being ranked in the top 16 of the FICP ranking for teams in May 1991. After the 1991 Giro d'Italia and the Dauphiné Libéré, the Tour organiser gave six additional wildcards.

Of the 198 cyclists starting the race, 38 were riding the Tour de France for the first time. The average age of riders in the race was 28.30 years, ranging from the 21-year-old Dimitri Zhdanov to the 36-year-old Gilbert Duclos-Lassalle. The  cyclists had the youngest average age while the riders on  had the oldest.

The teams entering the race were:

Qualified teams

 
 
 
 
 
 
 
 
 
 
 
 
 
 
 
 

Invited teams

 
 
 
 
 Tonton Tapis–GB

Pre-race favourites

Ahead of the 1991 Tour, defending champion Greg LeMond was considered the favourite to capture a fourth Tour victory, and third in a row. The Guardian's Stephen Bierley wrote that "it is excruciatingly difficult to make out a strong case for the Californian not to finish first in Paris". As had become the norm for LeMond, his early season results had been disappointing, since he chose to use those races as preparation for the Tour instead of trying to be competitive. He had dropped out of the Giro d'Italia and then finished 24th at the Tour de Suisse, one of the build-up races for the Tour de France.

Gianni Bugno was listed by The Guardian as LeMond's "greatest threat". Winner of the 1990 Giro d'Italia, he had finished the Italian Grand Tour fourth this year. In the 1990 Tour de France, he had finished seventh overall and won two stages, including one to the ski resort of Alpe d'Huez.

The third major name to be considered a favourite was Erik Breukink, third overall the year before. His strong abilities in individual time trials were counted as an advantage, having won one of them in the previous year's Tour. However, his tendency to experience one day of bad form in every Tour he had competed in so far was considered to be the major weakness he had to overcome.

The previous year's runner-up, Claudio Chiappucci, was also ranked among the contenders. Since his breakthrough performance in 1990, he had won the Milan–San Remo one-day race and finished second at the Giro d'Italia.

In addition to LeMond, three more former winners started the 1991 Tour: Pedro Delgado, the winner in 1988, had finished fourth in 1990, but commentators suspected that he might be past his prime. Laurent Fignon, who had won the race in 1983 and 1984, had, like LeMond, retired from the Giro d'Italia and experienced an early season without major results. However, The Guardian described him as "extremely fit and unusually relaxed". Stephen Roche (Tonton Tapis–GB), winner in 1987, had won the Critérium International earlier in the season, but having finished the Tour in 1990 only 44th, was considered to mainly compete for stage wins.

Bookmaker William Hill listed LeMond at 2-1 odds, followed by Bugno at 7–2, Breukink and Chiappucci at 6–1, and Delgado at 10–1.

Olaf Ludwig, who had won the points classification the year before, was again considered the favourite for it going into the 1991 Tour.

Route and stages

Race overview

The prologue was won by specialist Thierry Marie, who also had won the prologue in the previous race. LeMond finished with the third-best time. In the first stage, a group of eleven cyclists escaped, including some cyclists aiming for the overall win: LeMond, Breukink, Rolf Sørensen and Kelly. Marie was not in this group, and thanks to time bonuses LeMond became the race leader. Later that day, the team time trial (stage 2) was run, won by Sørensen's team, and Sørensen became the new leader of the general classification.

Sørensen kept the lead for a few stages, but in the fifth stage he fell (crashing into a traffic island) and broke his clavicle. He managed to finish the stage, but was unable to start the next stage, so the sixth stage started without a yellow jersey. His margin to the rest was big enough to put him back in the top position of the general classification. The time trial in stage eight was won by Miguel Induráin, with LeMond in second place, only eight seconds slower. This was enough to make LeMond the new leader, with Breukink in second place. Stage 9 saw the first Brazilian, Mauro Ribeiro, to win a stage at the Tour de France.

Before the tenth stage, two cyclists from PDM gave up. During that stage, two more gave up, and one came in late. The team revealed that the remaining four cyclists (including Breukink, Kelly and Alcalá, ranked in the top ten of the general classification) were also sick, and the next morning the entire team abandoned. There were rumours that a doping program had gone wrong, but no official penalties were given. After the eleventh stage, there was a rest day, on which the cyclists were transferred from Nantes to Pau, by airplane. Urs Zimmermann had a fear of flying, so he refused to use the airplane. The jury then disqualified him, but after the other cyclists protested, he was allowed to use other means of transportation.

The Tour entered the Pyrenees in the twelfth stage. A group escaped with some strong outsiders: Luc Leblanc, Charly Mottet and Pascal Richard. LeMond was unable to organise the chase, so the group stayed away until the finish. Mottet won the stage, and Leblanc became the new leader in the general classification, with LeMond now in second place.

The thirteenth stage included even more climbs than the twelfth stage. LeMond escaped on the bottom of the Tourmalet, but Indurain chased him and reached him, taking other cyclists with him. Near the top of the Tourmalet, LeMond was unable to follow, and lost contact with the others. After the top, LeMond was able to get back on the descent, but in the meantime Indurain had escaped. LeMond tried to get back to Indurain, but was unable to do so. When they reached the start of the climb of the Col d'Aspin, LeMond was within sight of Indurain, but on the climb Indurain increased the distance.

Claudio Chiappucci had escaped from the chasing group, and was getting close to Indurain. When Indurain heard this, he waited for Chiappucci; they then worked together to get away from LeMond. Chiappucci and Indurain stayed away until the finish; Chiappucci won the stage and Indurain became the new leader. LeMond finished that stage in ninth place, losing more than seven minutes.

The next three stages were relatively flat, and normally no important changes in the general classification are expected. But LeMond did everything he could to win back time, and escaped on the sixteenth stage; finishing in second place, he won back almost half a minute.

The seventeenth stage was in the Alps, with an uphill finish on l'Alpe d'Huez. Gianni Bugno won, closely followed by Indurain. LeMond lost two more minutes this stage.
The eighteenth stage was the last mountainous stage, and in this stage LeMond lost almost seven minutes. Indurain was leading the race, three minutes before Gianni Bugno. Because a time trial, Indurain's specialty, was the last serious obstacle in the race, Indurain was almost sure of the victory. And indeed, Indurain won that time trial, so he won the Tour de France of 1991.

In the last stage, there was a crash on the Champs-Élysées, just before the finish, after Djamolidine Abdoujaparov, sprinting for the stage victory, hit a barrier. Abdoujaparov was leading the points classification, but had to finish the stage to win this classification. After fifteen minutes, he was able to get up and walk his bicycle across the finish line.

Classification leadership and minor prizes

There were several classifications in the 1991 Tour de France. The most important was the general classification, calculated by adding each cyclist's finishing times on each stage. The cyclist with the least accumulated time was the race leader, identified by the yellow jersey; the winner of this classification is considered the winner of the Tour.

Additionally, there was a points classification, which awarded a green jersey. In the points classification, cyclists got points for finishing among the best in a stage finish, or in intermediate sprints. The cyclist with the most points lead the classification, and was identified with a green jersey.

There was also a mountains classification. The organisation had categorised some climbs as either hors catégorie, first, second, third, or fourth-category; points for this classification were won by the first cyclists that reached the top of these climbs first, with more points available for the higher-categorised climbs. The cyclist with the most points lead the classification, and wore a white jersey with red polka dots.

The fourth individual classification was the young rider classification, which was not marked by a jersey in 1991. This was decided the same way as the general classification, but only riders under 26 years were eligible.

For the team classification, the times of the best three cyclists per team on each stage were added; the leading team was the team with the lowest total time. The leaders of the team classification had previously worn yellow caps, but this was abandoned after the 1990 Tour.

In addition, there was a combativity award given after each mass-start stage to the cyclist considered most combative. The decision was made by a jury composed of journalists who gave points. The cyclist with the most points from votes in all stages led the combativity classification. Claudio Chiappucci won this classification, and was given overall the super-combativity award. The Souvenir Henri Desgrange was given in honour of Tour founder Henri Desgrange to the first rider to pass the summit of the Col du Tourmalet on stage 13. This prize was won by Chiappucci.

Final standings

General classification

Points classification

Mountains classification

Young rider classification

Team classification

Notes

References

Bibliography

Further reading

External links

 
1991 in road cycling
1991
1991 in French sport
July 1991 sports events in Europe